Tomáš Petříček (born 27 September 1981) is a Czech politician who served as Minister of Foreign Affairs from October 2018 to April 2021. Between August and October 2018 he also served as Deputy Minister of Foreign Affairs and from May to December 2017 he was Deputy Minister of Labor and Social Affairs.

Political career
He went through the ranks of the Young Social Democrats. In 2005, he became a political officer of the foreign department of the ČSSD and in 2006 its head.

Between 2007 and 2009 he was assistant to Libor Rouček, Member of the European Parliament, and from 2014 to 2017, he was an adviser to MEP Miroslav Poche. He was also involved in the preparation of this party's campaign in 2016 elections to regional councils. Meanwhile, he worked at the Prague City Hall, where he was in charge of European funds in the council's council, and served on the supervisory boards and boards of several companies, such as Rencar, Želivská provozní, Water Treatment Plant Želivka.

In May 2017 he was appointed political deputy minister of labor and social affairs of the Czech Republic Michaela Marksová in the government of Bohuslav Sobotka. He actively supported Petr Dolínek against Miloslav Ludvík in deciding on the position of the leading ČSSD candidate for the parliamentary elections in 2017.  In the municipal elections in 2018, he was the leading ČSSD candidate for the Prague 7 City Council and thus the party's candidate for the mayor of this district. However he failed to be elected to the city council.

He advocates that it is essential for the Czech Republic to remain an active member of the European Union and opposes a referendum on the possibility of leaving the EU. In his first public speech as deputy, he enlisted the transatlantic link and its values, as well as the key benefits of EU membership, with the need to overcome the current problems of the Union. Petříček has also repeatedly mentioned the need to revitalize human rights policy and pay attention to climate change.

Petříček stated his opposition to the Turkish invasion of the Kurdish areas in Syria and argued that it would worsen the situation of civilians and refugees.

Life 
He graduated in master's and doctoral programs in International Relations from the Faculty of Social Sciences of Charles University. He defended his dissertation on "Perspectives of the European Union's Energy Security". During his studies he also attended the Université Libre de Bruxelles.

He also received M.A. at the Center Européen de Recherches Internationales et Stratégiques in the field of Governance and Development Policy and the University of Warwick in International Political Economy.

References

Charles University alumni
Czech Social Democratic Party Government ministers
Foreign Ministers of the Czech Republic
Living people
1981 births
People from Rokycany